Bruttedius Niger was a rhetor and politician of the early Roman Empire. He also wrote a historical work.

Life 
Bruttedius Niger was a pupil of the rhetor Apollodorus of Pergamon. During the reign of the emperor Tiberius he held in 22 AD the office of an aedile. In the same year he was one of the accusers of the consul of the year 10 AD, Caius Junius Silanus. He seems to have regarded the declaimer Junius Otho – who also was an accuser of Junius Silanus – as an example in the field of rhetoric.

The historian Tacitus recognizes the talent of Bruttedius Niger but thinks that he went astray because of his ambition. According to Juvenal, Bruttedius Niger first was a friend of Sejanus, but after the downfall and death of the powerful commander of the Praetorian Guard (31 AD) he kicked Sejanus's body.

Seneca the Elder has preserved two passages of Bruttedius Niger's historical work which deal with the assassination of Cicero (43 BC). About the death of this famous orator Seneca also provides excerpts of other contemporary historians, for example of Livy, Gaius Asinius Pollio, Aufidius Bassus, Aulus Cremutius Cordus and the poem by Cornelius Severus.

Notes

References 
 Walter Henze, Bruttedius (2), Realencyclopädie der Classischen Altertumswissenschaft (Stuttgart, 1897), vol. III.1,  col. 907.

Ancient Roman writers
Ancient Roman rhetoricians
1st-century Romans
1st-century historians
1st-century BC births
1st-century deaths
Year of birth unknown
Year of death unknown